Early American Studies is a peer-reviewed history journal covering the study of the histories and cultures of North America prior to 1850. The journal is sponsored by The McNeil Center for Early American Studies at the University of Pennsylvania. It is published quarterly by the University of Pennsylvania Press. It was established in 2003 and the editor-in-chief is Roderick A. McDonald (Rider University). It is available online through Project MUSE.

External links 
 
 The McNeil Center for Early American Studies

Triannual journals
English-language journals
History of the Americas journals
Publications established in 2003
University of Pennsylvania Press academic journals